Events from the year 1645 in art.

Events
 (unknown)

Works

Paintings
 Claude Lorrain - Landscape with Apollo and Mercury
 William Dobson - The Painter with Sir Charles Cottrell and another (approx. date)
 Rembrandt
Girl at a Window
Holy Family
Portrait of an Old Man
Self-portrait
 Salvator Rosa - Philosophy (approx. date)
 Diego Velázquez - Portrait of Sebastián de Morra (approx. date)

Sculpture
Gianlorenzo Bernini - Truth Unveiled by Time

Births
January 11 - Matthias Rauchmiller, German sculptor active in Vienna (died 1686)
August 30 - Giuseppe Avanzi, Italian painter of the Baroque period (died 1718)
September - Romeyn de Hooghe, Dutch Baroque engraver and caricaturist (died 1708)
September 14 - Jeremiah Dummer, American silversmith and portrait painter (died 1718)
October 26 - Aert de Gelder, Dutch painter in the tradition of Rembrandt's late style (died 1727)
December 6 – Maria de Dominici, Maltese sculptor and painter (died 1703)
date unknown
Giovanni Antonio Fumiani, Italian painter of the Baroque period (died 1710)
François de Troy, French painter, father of Jean-François de Troy (died 1730)
Carlo Girolamo Bersotti, Italy painter of the Baroque period, specialized in painting still lifes (died unknown)
Sebastiano Taricco, Italian painter of the Baroque period (died 1710)
Jean-Baptiste Théodon, French sculptor (died 1713)
probable
Giulio Giacinto Avellino, Italian painter (died 1700)
Urbano Romanelli, Italian painter in Rome and in churches at Velletri (died 1682)
Andrea Lanzani, Italian painter for the Habsburg court (died 1712)

Deaths
April 11 - Ferraù Fenzoni, Italian painter active in Todi
April 14 - Shi Kefa, Chinese government official and calligrapher (born 1601)
May - Ambrosius Bosschaert II, Dutch flower painter (born 1609)
July 12 - Luciano Borzone, Italian painter of the Baroque period with an antique style (born 1590)
September - Julius Porcellis, Dutch marine artist (born c.1610)
December 12 - Giovanni Bernardino Azzolini or Mazzolini or Asoleni, Italian painter (born 1572)
date unknown
Juan Alfonso Abril, Spanish painter active mainly in his native Valladolid (born unknown)
Christoffel van den Berghe, Dutch painter (born 1590)
Hans Gillisz. Bollongier, Dutch still life painter (born 1600)
Paolo Domenico Finoglia, Italian painter (born 1590)
Sebastiano Ghezzi, Italian painter and architect (born 1580)
Jacob van der Heyden, Flemish Baroque painter, sculptor and engraver (born 1573)
Francisco Varela, Spanish Baroque painter (born 1580)
Wen Zhenheng, Chinese Ming dynasty scholar, painter, and landscape garden designer (born 1585)

References

 
Years of the 17th century in art
1640s in art